Henchir-el-Kermate is a location in Tunisia and set of Roman Era ruins. The ruins are in a square shape, with perimeter of 500 meters round the enclosure. The remains of a small temple or mausoleum. There are also traces of a pont bridge, Cisterns. and several illegible inscriptions.

References

Archaeological sites in Tunisia
Roman towns and cities in Tunisia
Populated places in Tunisia